Roger Hägglund (2 July 1961  – 6 June 1992) was a professional ice hockey defenceman who played three games for the Quebec Nordiques of the National Hockey League in 1984–85.

Hägglund was drafted 138th overall in the 1980 NHL Entry Draft by the St. Louis Blues.

He played 13 seasons in IF Björklöven in Umeå, both before and after his time in NHL, and participated in their winning the national championship in 1987.

Hägglund was killed in a car accident in Sweden in 1992. IF Björklöven retired number 23, worn by Hägglund, after the accident.

See also
List of ice hockey players who died during their playing career

External links

1961 births
1992 deaths
Fredericton Express players
Frölunda HC players
IF Björklöven players
Sportspeople from Umeå
Quebec Nordiques players
Road incident deaths in Sweden
St. Louis Blues draft picks
Swedish ice hockey defencemen
Swedish expatriate ice hockey players in Canada